Viviann Gerdin (born 1944) is a Swedish Centre Party politician. She was a member of the Riksdag from 1998 to 2006.

External links
Viviann Gerdin at the Riksdag website

1944 births
Living people
Members of the Riksdag from the Centre Party (Sweden)
Women members of the Riksdag
Members of the Riksdag 2002–2006
21st-century Swedish women politicians
Date of birth missing (living people)
Place of birth missing (living people)
Members of the Riksdag 1998–2002